Machakel is a woreda in Amhara Region, Ethiopia. Part of the Misraq Gojjam Zone, Machakel is bordered on the south by Debre Elias, on the northwest by the Mirab Gojjam Zone, on the east by Sinan, and on the southeast by Guzamn. Towns in Machakel include Amanuel. Woreda of Debre Elias was separated from Machakel.

Demographics
Based on the 2007 national census conducted by the Central Statistical Agency of Ethiopia (CSA), this woreda has a total population of 118,097, an increase of -37.34% over the 1994 census, of whom 58,529 are men and 59,568 women; 8,728 or 7.39% are urban inhabitants. With an area of 746.43 square kilometers, Machakel has a population density of 158.22, which is greater than the Zone average of 153.8 persons per square kilometer. A total of 27,967 households were counted in this woreda, resulting in an average of 4.22 persons to a household, and 27,143 housing units. The majority of the inhabitants practiced Ethiopian Orthodox Christianity, with 98.87% reporting that as their religion, while 1.1% of the population said they were Muslim.

The 1994 national census reported a total population for this woreda of 188,472 in 38,915 households, of whom 94,269 were men and 94,203 were women; 9,439 or 5.01% of its population were urban dwellers. The largest ethnic group reported in Machakel was the Amhara (99.92%). The majority of the inhabitants practiced Ethiopian Orthodox Christianity, with 98.77% reporting that as their religion, while 1.15% were Muslim.

Notes

Districts of Amhara Region